Silcox Island is an inhabited island in American Lake in Pierce County, Washington. It is in the city of Lakewood, Washington. Although the island has had homes built on it, it is still mostly forested.

History
Silcox Island is named for Albert Silcox, who originally acquired the land. Although at first he and his family were the sole inhabitants, financial needs led him to sell to friends, beginning with George Sells and Sells' son-in-law, Earl Trowbridge. Over time, more and more lots were established and sold.

Until 1968, there was no electric or telephone service to the island. After a cable was run from near Bill's Boathouse, most residents had their homes electrified. Although a few homes were connected to septic tanks, many used outhouses well into the 1980s.

Climate
The Köppen climate classification is warm-summer Mediterranean climate (Csb).

References

Lake islands of Washington (state)
Islands of Pierce County, Washington